Western Suburbs Soccer Club is an association football club based in the suburb of Sunshine, Melbourne, Victoria, Australia.  The club was formed in 1965 and currently competes in the Victorian State League Division 2 North-West. Western Suburbs have participated in the Victorian Premier League on two occasions.

History
Western Suburbs SC was formed in the Western Suburbs of Melbourne, Sunshine in 1965 by local Greek immigrants. Since then the club has become home to many Greeks that live around the area, who enjoy the social club at Western Suburbs SC.

Western Suburbs SC has participated in the Victorian State League six times, and Victorian Premier League twice. Western Suburbs highest finish in the Victorian State League was 1st, while the highest finish in the Victorian Premier League was 9th. The longest stay in the Victorian State Leagues was 5 seasons, between 1984 and 1988. Western Suburbs have consistently stayed in the top divisions in Melbourne.

In 2015, on their 60th anniversary Western Suburbs won the Victorian State League Division 1 North-West championship.

In 2018, Suburbs were relegated from State League 1 North-West, finishing the season in bottom place.

Former Coaches
 Les Scheinflug - Australian Assistant Coach at the 1974 World Cup and also Senior Coach of Australia in 1981-1984, 1990 & 1994. Now retired.
 Vlado Vanis - Coached many Australian teams including the Melbourne Knights, Heidelberg United & Preston Lions. 
 Michael Chatzitrifonos - Coached Western Suburbs in a tremendous season in the VPL in 2007. 
 Kon Pappas - Coached Western Suburbs during the 2008 season in the VPL. 
 Ange Postecoglou -  Started his coaching career at Suburbs in 1994. Regarded as one of the best Australian coaches.

Former players
  Ange Postecoglou
  Victor Cristaldo
  Adrian Zahra
  Lorenz Kindtner
  Iswadi Idris
  Germain Bationo

Titles
Victorian State Division 2 Champions 1972
Victorian State Division 1 Champions 1979
Victorian State Division 1 Champions 1983
Victorian State Division 1 Champions 2006
Hellenic Cup Champions 2012
Victorian State Division 1 Champions 2015

Current squad

  Stelios Tzanoudakis (C)
  Luka Runje
  Marc Dezic
  Louis Paolozza
  Phil Lloyd (VC)
  Thomas Sudevski
  Pano Avramidis
  Ivan Lulic
  Yiannis Tzanoudakis
  Mathew Sanders 
  Cam Bunn
  Reng Tung
  George Fakos
  Oliver Paolozza
  Savvas Thalalaios
  Josh Holt
  Daniel Cassar
  Gianluca Romano
  Marcus Tasevski
  Guy Runje

Coaches
  Sam Papadopoulos
  Jose Mansila

References

External links
Official Website

Soccer clubs in Melbourne
Victorian State League teams
Greek-Australian culture in Melbourne
Association football clubs established in 1965
1965 establishments in Australia
Sport in the City of Brimbank